The 1st IAAF Continental Cup was an international track and field sporting event held under the auspices of the International Association of Athletics Federations. Originally scheduled as the 11th IAAF World Cup in Athletics, it was renamed in 2008 when the IAAF revamped the competition format. It was held in Split, Croatia on 4–5 September 2010.

The competition mascot was an anthropomorphic white seagull with a blue hat and scarf, named Marino. Designed by children from the Juraj Bonači educational centre, the mascot builds on the fact that Split is a coastal city.

The attendance for the second day of the competition was about 25,000.

Format
The four teams competing in the event were Africa, the Americas, Asia-Pacific and Europe. The African and European teams were selected via the results of the 2010 African Championships in Athletics and the 2010 European Athletics Championships, respectively. The Americas team selection was assembled from the athletes at the top of the season's lists on 31 July 2010. Two athletes from each region were selected per event, with the exception of the 1500 metres and long distance track events (where teams may field three athletes, although only two count towards the team points total).

These rules represented a departure from the previous format of the IAAF World Cup. National teams were removed from the programme and the areas governed by the Asian Athletics Association and the Oceania Athletics Association sent a combined team for the first time. The two-day competition comprised a programme of 20 track and field events for men and women, giving a total of 40 events.

Standings
The standings following the event were:

After doping disqualifications of Andrei Mikhnevich and Marwa Hussein in 2013, their scores were deleted and others amended, which changed the result in the tight team competition.

The revised scores were:

Americas were awarded the Continental Cup in a ceremony at the 2014 IAAF Continental Cup.

Further to this, Mariya Abakumova was disqualified following a doping sanction in 2018, and her results deleted with those in the women's javelin amended.

The revised scores are as follows:

Medal summary

Men

1  of Europe originally won the bronze medal with 20.68m, but he was disqualified in 2012 after a retest of his samples from the 2005 World Championships tested positive for clenbuterol, methandienone and oxandrolone.

Women

1   of Europe originally won the gold medal with 68.14, but she was disqualified in 2018 after her results from 2008 to 2016 were deleted after a retest of her samples from the 2012 Olympics were positive for dehydrochlormethyltestosterone (oral turanibol).

Score Table

Results

References

External links

Official competition website

IAAF Continental Cup
International athletics competitions hosted by Croatia
Sport in Split, Croatia
Continental Cup
IAAF Continental Cup